The International Journal of Behavioral Medicine is a quarterly peer-reviewed medical journal covering behavioral medicine. It was established in 1994 and is published by Springer Science+Business Media on behalf of the International Society of Behavioral Medicine, of which it is the official journal. The editors-in-chief is Michael A. Hoyt. According to the Journal Citation Reports, the journal has a 2017 impact factor of 2.012.

References

External links

Publications established in 1994
Quarterly journals
Springer Science+Business Media academic journals
English-language journals
Academic journals associated with learned and professional societies
Behavioral medicine journals